The Oates' Valor is a short film written and directed by Tim Thaddeus Cahill. Cahill's first film is a coming of age comedy of a son's conflict with his demanding father. This 14 minute color piece was filmed on Super 16 mm film.

Plot
Teenage Boyson Oates (played by Jordan David) conflicts with his demanding father (played by Jack Moore). After an unsuccessful attempt to follow his father's orders, Boyson runs away from home, but is lured back for a reconciliation by one final parental act of appeasement.

Reception
The film premiered at the Sundance Film Festival. It has been featured at the Silver Lake Film Festival, the Nantucket International Film Festival, Small Potato Short Film Festival, and the Dereel Independent Film Festival.

It will be a Competition Short at the 2007 Cannes Film Festival.

External links

2007 CANNES FILM FESTIVAL LINE-UP from Film Threat online
Clip from the Sundance Film Festival
Epistrophe Films
Indiewire
Matt Barber
David Rom

References

2007 films
2007 short films
American short films